The Shakanai mine is one of the largest lead and zinc mines in Japan. The mine is located in northern Japan in Akita Prefecture. The mine has reserves amounting to 30 million tonnes of ore grading 0.9% lead, 3.3% zinc, 0.34 million oz of gold and 73.9 million oz of silver.

References 

Lead and zinc mines in Japan